Alexandr Fyodorovich Budnikov (born May 10, 1956) is a
Soviet sailor. He won the silver medal in Mixed Three Person Keelboat in the 1980 Summer Olympics in Moscow along with Boris Budnikov and Nikolay Poliakov.

References

1956 births
Russian male sailors (sport)
Olympic sailors of the Soviet Union
Olympic silver medalists for the Soviet Union
Soviet male sailors (sport)
Olympic medalists in sailing
Living people
Sailors at the 1980 Summer Olympics – Soling
Medalists at the 1980 Summer Olympics
European Champions Soling